The Beaver Bridge in Beaver, Arkansas, is a historic one-lane suspension bridge carrying Arkansas Highway 187 over the White River at Table Rock Lake. Built in 1949 by the Pioneer Construction Company, the structure is the only suspension bridge open to traffic in Arkansas. The Beaver Bridge was added to the National Register of Historic Places in 1990.

History

The bridge was bid on December 19, 1947, to Pioneer Construction Company of Malvern, Arkansas. The construction foreman who led the project was M. R. Blair (1914-2014), who later served as lead foreman on numerous bridge and highway projects across Arkansas, Missouri, and Tennessee, and who led the construction of numerous dams, highways and bridges throughout the southwestern United States, including the 1964 Big I interchange of Interstates 25 and 40 in Albuquerque, New Mexico. Remarkably, Blair and his team completed the project without the benefit of an industrial crane, using only a pickup-mounted, knuckle-boom type crane.

Since the construction was coincident with the building of Table Rock Dam, completion was delayed until 1949 as the United States Army Corps of Engineers required the bridge to be raised . Upon completion, the bridge remained a vital link for the citizens of Beaver until its closure for major deck rehabilitation in 1981. Further rehabilitation occurred in 2003. The bridge has a 10-ton weight limit. The bridge was temporarily closed for inspection in October 2018 after two overweight buses crossed it.

See also
List of bridges documented by the Historic American Engineering Record in Arkansas
List of bridges on the National Register of Historic Places in Arkansas
National Register of Historic Places listings in Carroll County, Arkansas

References

External links

Road bridges on the National Register of Historic Places in Arkansas
Historic American Engineering Record in Arkansas
National Register of Historic Places in Carroll County, Arkansas
Transportation in Carroll County, Arkansas
Steel bridges in the United States
Suspension bridges in the United States
White River (Arkansas–Missouri)
1949 establishments in Arkansas
Bridges completed in 1949